S. edule may refer to:
 Saccharum edule, a plant species belonging of the genus Saccharum, the sugarcane
 Sechium edule, an edible plant species

Synonyms 
 Solanum edule, a synonym for Solanum sisymbriifolium, a plant species
 Stylophyllum edule, a synonym for Dudleya edulis, a plant species

See also
 Edule (disambiguation)